Wanda Dalla Costa is a practicing architect and professor who has been co-designing with North American indigenous communities for nearly two decades. Her teaching and research focuses include indigenous place-keeping, culturally responsive design, sustainable housing, and climate resiliency in architecture. Dalla Costa currently teaches at Arizona State University as Institute Professor and associate professor in The Design School and the School of Sustainable Engineering and the Built Environment. She is a member of Saddle Lake Cree Nation and the first First Nations woman architect in Canada. She is founding principal and owner of the firm, Redquill Architecture Inc., which is based in Phoenix, Arizona. She was one of eighteen indigenous architects representing Canada in the Venice Architecture Biennale 2018.

Early life and education
Wanda Dalla Costa's mother is one of six children and is from Saddle Lake First Nation, Alberta. All but one of the children went to residential school. Her grandfather is from Goodfish Lake, Alberta and her grandmother is from Saddle Lake, Alberta.

In 1990, she began a formative backpacking journey through Australia and New Zealand. Although the trip was intended to be a gap year abroad, her travels continued for seven years and included thirty-seven countries. Dallas Costa earned her  master's degree in Design Research in the department of City Design, Planning and Policy from Southern California Institute of Architecture (SCI-Arc) and another master's degree in architecture from the University of Calgary. She has a Bachelor's of Arts in Sociology and Native Studies from University of Alberta.

Career 
Dalla Costa founded Redquill Architecture Inc., in 2010 in order to exclusively work with tribal communities and investigate ways of re-instilling the built environment with meaning from studies of traditional worldviews. Projects include the Niitsitapi Learning Centre in Calgary, several buildings at Red Crow Community College in Cardston, Fort McMurray First Nation Community Recreation Centre, and the Tsuu T’ina Nation Office Building in Edmonton. She is a registered architect in Arizona and California. 
 
She also teaches at Arizona State University (ASU) as both an Institute Professor and associate professor. Dalla Costa's teaching includes interdisciplinary service learning studios. She is also the founding director of the Indigenous Design Collaborative at ASU which carries out design and design-build projects with local tribes in Arizona. The collaborative makes connections between tribal community members, multidisciplinary ASU students and faculty, and industry.

She is on the board of the Construction in Indian Country Advisory Council, chair of the Subcommittee on Indigenous Architecture Education, Indigenous Task Force, member of the Royal Architecture Institute of Canada (RAIC) Indigenous Task Force, and member of the American Indian Council of Architects and Engineers (AICAE).

Awards 

 2019, Yerba Buena Center for the Arts, YBCA 100
 2018, Venice Biennale, Team Canada Finalist
 2017, Buckminster Fuller Catalyst Program Finalist
 2017, MacArthur 100 & Change (top 17%; invited to the Buckmister Fuller Catalyst Program)

Publications 

 Dalla Costa, W. (2018 in press). “Teaching Indigeneity in Architecture: Indigenous Placekeeping Framework.” In Kiddle, R., Stewart. L.P  & O’Brien, K. (eds). Our Voices: Indigeneity and Architecture,  ORO Editions, New York, NY, USA: 146–153.
 Dalla Costa, W. (2018 in press). “Metrics and margins: Envisioning frameworks in Indigenous architecture in Canada.”  In Grant, E., Greenop, K. & Refiti, A. (eds). Handbook of Contemporary Indigenous Architecture. 2017, Springer International, The University of Adelaide, Sydney, Australia: 193–221.
 Dalla Costa, W. (2011) "An emerging narrative: Aboriginal contributions to Canadian architecture". pp. 356–379 In: Voyageur, C. J., D. R. Newhouse and D. Beavon eds., Hidden in Plain Sight: Contributions of Aboriginal Peoples to Canadian Identity and Culture. University of Toronto Press. Toronto, Canada. .
 Dalla Costa, W. (2016) “Contextualized Metrics and Narrating Binaries: Defining Place and Process in Indigenous North America,” A Conference paper presented at Association of Collegiate Schools of Architecture (ACSA), 2016 International Conference. Santiago, Chile.
 Dalla Costa W. (2017) “Housing Equity and Heat Vulnerability: A Case Study for Indigenous Design and Construction.” In: M. Young (ed.), AMPS Proceedings Series 9. Living and Sustainability: An Environmental Critique of Design and Building Practices, Locally and Globally. London South Bank University, London, 08 – 9 February 2017. pp: 543–554.
 Costa, Wanda Dalla, et al. “Unique Features of Conducting Construction Activities Within Tribal Communities.” Construction Research Congress 2018, pp. 233–42.
 Dalla Costa, Wanda. “Indigenous Futurity and Architecture: Rewriting the Urban Narrative.” Architecture Australia, vol. 109, no. 2, 2020, pp. 56–58.

Selected Projects

External links 

 Sussman, Deborah. Between Classes: Season 1, Episode 4, Wanda Dalla Costa, 2018. https://www.youtube.com/watch?v=jFbBYJnpy8Q.

References 

Living people
Architects from Arizona
Canadian women architects
University of Alberta alumni
University of Calgary alumni
University of Arizona faculty
Southern California Institute of Architecture alumni
Year of birth missing (living people)
Place of birth missing (living people)
People from Alberta
First Nations architects
Cree people
Canadian women academics
20th-century Canadian architects
21st-century Canadian architects
First Nations women